The Embassy of Oman in Washington, D.C. is the Sultanate of Oman's diplomatic mission to the United States. It is located at 2535 Belmont Road Northwest, Washington, D.C. in the Kalorama neighborhood. 

The Ambassador is Hunaina al-Mughairy.

References

External links

Cultural Office Official website
wikimapia

Oman
Washington, D.C.
Oman–United States relations